713 Requests Permission to Land is a 1962 Soviet disaster film.  It was directed by Grigori Nikulin and filmed at Lenfilm studio.

The premiere took place on April 3, 1962.

Synopsis 
In an attempted political assassination, the crew of transatlantic flight 713 is poisoned by contaminated coffee, gradually rendering them unconscious, and leaving the plane to temporarily fly on autopilot. The passengers, however, remain oblivious. Soon the cockpit door is opened and the state of the crew is discovered and panic erupts. The aircraft begins losing altitude. A doctor, played by Vladimir Chestnokov, forces his way into the cockpit and regains control of the plane. Now he must guide the aircraft to a safe landing on Russian soil.

Cast
 Vladimir Chestnokov as Richard Gunther, doctor-antifascist, hiding under the name of Philip Dubois
 Otar Koberidze  as unemployed lawyer Henry, JD (voiced the role of Artyom Karapetyan)
 Lev Krugly as Jiri, journalist, and chronicler
 Lyudmila Abramova as  Eva Priestley 
 Nikolai Korn as secret service agent
 Yefim Kopelyan as salesman, pharmacist
 Lyudmila Shagalova as   Teresa 
 Joseph Konopatsky as missionary
 Vladimir Vysotsky as  US Marine 
 Sergey Golovanov as American
 Nina Agapova as American woman
 Nonna Ten as Vietnamese girl
 Vladimir Marev as crew commander

Film distribution in USSR 
In the Soviet box office in 1962, the film ranked 13th (27.9 million viewers).

References

External links

 713 Requests Permission to Land at kino-teatr.ru

1962 films
1960s disaster films
1960s thriller drama films
Soviet thriller drama films
Films about aviation accidents or incidents
Russian disaster films
Lenfilm films
Soviet black-and-white films
Requests Permission
1962 in the Soviet Union
Films about aviators
Russian thriller drama films
1960s Russian-language films